The 2013 World Ports Classic is the second edition of the two-day cycle race between the port cities of Rotterdam and Antwerp. It is scheduled to start on 30 August 2013 and finish one day later on 31 August 2013.

Teams Participating

Bretagne-Séché Environnement
Champion System Pro Cycling Team
Color Code-Biowanze

Race overview

Stages

Stage 1
30 August 2013 – Antwerp to Rotterdam,

Stage 2
31 August 2013 – Rotterdam to Antwerp,

Leadership Classifications

References 

2013
2013 in Belgian sport
2013 UCI Europe Tour
2013 in Dutch sport